Apurguan is a settlement on the west coast of Guam. It is located in the village of Mongmong-Toto-Maite, east of the capital, Hagåtña and south of Tamuning.

Populated places in Guam